Perry Florio (born ), is an American former professional ice hockey player who spent the majority of his career with the Johnstown Chiefs of the ECHL.

Career
Florio played the 1986 and 1987 seasons for the Providence College Friars, leading the team in penalty minutes both years. Following the 1986 season, Florio was named to the United States men's national junior ice hockey team for the World Junior Championships.

Florio transferred to Northern Michigan University, where he played ten games in his senior year in 1989.

He started his pro career in the 1989-90 season for the Knoxville Cherokees of the East Coast Hockey League before going to the Johnstown Chiefs the next season.  Save for a three-game stint with the Hershey Bears of the American Hockey League in 1992, he played the rest of his professional career in Johnstown, retiring after the 1995 season; he served as the team's captain, and was named to the franchise's 20th Anniversary Team.  At the time of his retirement, he was the all-time ECHL leader in games played.  He was further honored by being named to the ECHL's all-time 10th Anniversary Team in 1997.

Florio also played in Roller Hockey International for the Philadelphia Bulldogs in 1994 and 1995; he played in the RHI All-Star Game in 1994.

Coaching
After retiring as a player, Florio became an assistant coach for the Roanoke Express of the ECHL in 1998, and was named head coach and general manager in 2000. After making some controversial and unsuccessful trades, he was fired in January 2003 with the team just out of first place, a move unpopular with the players. He was promptly hired as interim head coach for the Anchorage Aces, with whom he finished the season, before going on to be the head coach for the Pee Dee Pride in the 2004 and 2005 seasons.  He also was the head coach of the Elmira Jackals of the United Hockey League in 2006.

Career statistics

External links

References

1967 births
American men's ice hockey defensemen
Hershey Bears players
Johnstown Chiefs players
Knoxville Cherokees players
Living people
Los Angeles Kings draft picks
Northern Michigan Wildcats men's ice hockey players
Philadelphia Bulldogs players
Providence Friars men's ice hockey players